Pierre Salomon Ségalas d'Etchépare (1 August 1792 – 19 October 1875) was a French physician. He is noted for creating the "speculum for urethra", the precursor to the endoscope, which was presented in 1826 to the Academy of Science in Paris, and for the idea of practising an exclusive speciality.

References

1792 births
1875 deaths
19th-century French physicians
Burials at Père Lachaise Cemetery